Zygfryd Perlicki (26 January 1932, in Gdynia – 10 August 2017) was a sailor from Poland. He represented his country at the 1972 Summer Olympics in Kiel. He took 8th place in the Soling with Józef Błaszczyk and Stanisław Stefański as fellow crew members.

Perlicki sailed on Copernicus during the first Whitbread Round the World Race in 1973-74.

References

External links
 
 
 
 

1932 births
2017 deaths
Sportspeople from Gdynia
People from Pomeranian Voivodeship (1919–1939)
Polish male sailors (sport)
Olympic sailors of Poland
Sailors at the 1972 Summer Olympics – Soling
Volvo Ocean Race sailors